Morris Keith Hopkins, FBA (20 June 1934 – 8 March 2004) was a British historian and sociologist. He was professor of ancient history at the University of Cambridge from 1985 to 2000.

Hopkins had a relatively unconventional route to the Cambridge professorship. After Brentwood School, he graduated in classics at King's College, Cambridge in 1958. He spent time as a graduate student, much influenced by Moses Finley, but left before completing his doctorate for an assistant lectureship in sociology at the University of Leicester (1961–1963).

Hopkins returned to Cambridge as a research fellow at King's College, Cambridge (1963–1967) while at the same time taking a lectureship at the London School of Economics, before spending two years as professor of sociology at Hong Kong University (1967–1969) After a further two years at the LSE (1970–72), he moved to Brunel University as professor of sociology in 1972, also serving as dean of the social sciences faculty from 1981 to 1985. He is most famed for Conquerors and Slaves, whereas he argued that ancient historians need not submit to the sources they studied, but rather demanded they be questioned and understood within their larger context of interaction. His rethinking of traditionalist methodology, and famed disagreement with traditionalist Millar, makes him one of the most influential twentieth-century ancient historians.

In 1985 Hopkins was elected to the Cambridge chair in ancient history. The fullest account of his career and significance as an ancient historian is in his British Academy necrology (W. V. Harris, Proceedings of the British Academy, 130 (2005), 3–27).

Publications
Books
Conquerors And Slaves (1978)
Death And Renewal (1983)
A World Full of Gods (1999)
Rome The Cosmopolis (2002), a volume of essays written in honour of Keith Hopkins
The Colosseum (2005), coauthored with Mary Beard
Sociological Studies in Roman History (2017), a collection of previously published articles, edited by Christopher Kelly.
Articles
List of Links to Articles by Hopkins published in History Today

References

1934 births
2004 deaths
People educated at Brentwood School, Essex
British sociologists
Alumni of King's College, Cambridge
Fellows of King's College, Cambridge
Academics of Brunel University London
Academics of the London School of Economics
Academics of the University of Leicester
Members of the University of Cambridge faculty of classics
20th-century British historians
Professors of Ancient History (Cambridge)
Fellows of the British Academy